Tandrange is a Sino-Tibetan language spoken in a few ethnic Gurung villages of Lamjung District, Nepal. Tandrange is spoken in the villages of Tāndrāṅ, Pokharī Thok, and Jītā. It belongs to the Greater Magaric branch of the Sino-Tibetan language family.

According to Schorer (2016), the Tandrange language is closely related to the recently extinct Dura language, which was also spoken in Lamjung District. However, Tandrange speakers adamantly consider themselves as not related to the stigmatized Dura people.

Numerals
The Tandrange numerals are:

 'one'
 'two'
 'three'
 'four'
 'five'
 'six'
 'ten'

References

External links
The last of Nepal's Dura speakers BBC news story

Languages of Nepal
Magaric languages